Sultan Yahya Petra ibni Almarhum Sultan Ibrahim  (10 December 1917 – 29 March 1979) was the sixth Yang di-Pertuan Agong (King) of Malaysia from 21 September 1975 to his death, and the 27th Sultan of Kelantan and the 10th Sultan of Modern Kelantan

Early life

He was born on at 4:00 pm. Monday 10 December 1917, Tengku Yahya Petra at Istana Balai Besar in Kota Bharu, Kelantan. He was the second son of Sultan Ibrahim ibni Almarhum Sultan Muhammad IV (b. 1897; reigned 1944–1960) by his third wife, Cik Embong binti Encik Daud (1899–1971), who was later promoted to the style Che Puan Besar by her son.

The young Tengku Yahya Petra was raised by his childless uncle, Tengku Ismail, later Sultan Ismail ibni Almarhum Sultan Muhammad IV. He was sent to the Francis Light School in Penang before continuing his studies in England. His uncle, Sultan Ismail, appointed him Tengku Temenggong Kelantan on 21 July 1939. He was later promoted to Tengku Bendahara Kelantan on 6 February 1945 by his father, then Sultan Ibrahim. He served in various Kelantan civil service posts from 1941 to 1948.

Kelantan succession dispute
Tengku Indra Petra was the eldest son of Sultan Ibrahim and elder brother of Sultan Yahya Petra. After Sultan Ibrahim succeeded his childless brother Sultan Ismail, Tengku Indra Petra was appointed heir apparent with the title of Raja Muda Kelantan on 25 October 1944. However, due to conflict with his father, he was dismissed from the post and removed from the line of succession by his father's decree on 1 February 1948. On the same day, Sultan Yahya Petra replaced his brother as heir apparent with the new title of Tengku Mahkota Kelantan.

Tengku Indra Petra became a politician and was elected a Member of Parliament (MP) in the first federal legislative election of 1955. Tengku Indra's descendants have since disputed their family's exclusion from the line succession of the Kelantan throne.

Tengku Indra Petra did not preside over the installation of Sultan Yahya Petra's successor, Sultan Ismail Petra, It was Tengku Panglima Raja Tengku Ahmad who presided over installations of Sultan Ibrahim, Sultan Yahya Petra and Sultan Ismail Petra. Tengku Panglima Raja was the father of the former Sultanah of Johor, Sultanah Zanariah binti Tengku Ahmad.

Accession
Sultan Yahya Petra (as he became) succeeded his father a day after the latter's death on 9 July 1960. He was crowned on 17 July 1961 at Istana Balai Besar in Kota Bharu.

Election as Deputy Yang di-Pertuan Agong
Sultan Yahya Petra served as Deputy Yang di-Pertuan Agong, the federal deputy king between 21 September 1970 until 20 September 1975.

Election as Yang di-Pertuan Agong
During the election of the sixth Yang di-Pertuan Agong (the federal king), the most senior ruler Sultan Ismail of Johor declined to be considered. Sultan Yahya Petra also declined nomination at first due to having suffered a serious stroke, but changed his mind and was duly elected. His term began from 21 September 1975.

Kingship
Malaysia's second prime minister Tun Abdul Razak died on 14 January 1976 less than four months into Sultan Yahya Petra's reign as Yang di-Pertuan Agong.

In 1977 a state of emergency was declared in his own state following a political crisis and violence.

Death and funeral
Sultan Yahya Petra died of an apparent heart attack at 3:45 pm at the National Palace on 29 March 1979. His coffin lay in state at the National Palace for a day and was then taken by plane to Kota Bharu where it was buried at the Kelantan Royal Mausoleum .

Family life
He was married to Tengku Zainab binti Tengku Sri Utama Raja Tengku Muhammad Petra (1917–1993), who was styled Raja Perempuan Zainab II (her stepmother-in-law was Raja Perempuan Zainab I, consort of Sultan Ibrahim) and Raja Permaisuri Agong. Sultan Yahya Petra and Raja Perempuan Zainab II had one son and six daughters. However, their two daughters died when they were young. He also married Tengku Alexandria binti Tengku Yusuf and was given a son.

Issue

Awards and recognitions
Sultan Yahya Petra held the rank of Marshal of the Royal Malaysian Air Force.

Honours of Kelantan 
  Recipient (21 July 1939) and Grand Master (1960–1979) of the Royal Family Order of Kelantan or "Star of Yunus" (DK)
  Knight Grand Commander (SPMK, 9 August 1950) and Grand Master (1960–1979) of the Order of the Crown of Kelantan or "Star of Muhammad"
  Knight Grand Commander (SJMK, 9 August 1959) and Grand Master (1960–1979) of the Order of the Life of the Crown of Kelantan or "Star of Ismail"
  Founding Grand Master and Knight Grand Commander of the Order of the Loyalty to the Crown of Kelantan or "Star of Ibrahim" (SPSK, 10 December 1967 – 29 March 1979)
 Grand Master of the Order of the Most Distinguished and Most Valiant Warrior (PYGP, 9 July 1960 – 29 March 1979)

Honours of Malaysia 
  :
 Recipient of Order of the Royal House of Malaysia (DKM) (1975-1979)
 Recipient (17 July 1961) and Grand Master (1975-1979) of the Order of the Crown of the Realm (DMN)
 Grand Master (1975-1979) of the Order of the Defender of the Realm
 Grand Master (1975-1979) of the Order of Loyalty to the Crown of Malaysia
 Grand Master (1975-1979) of the Order of Merit of Malaysia
 Grand Master (1979-1979) of the Order of the Royal Household of Malaysia
 Grand Commander of the Order of the Defender of the Realm (SMN) – Tun (31 August 1958)
  :
  Member of the Royal Family Order of Kedah (DK) (5 July 1969)
  :
  Member 1st class of the Family Order of the Crown of Indra of Pahang (DK I)
  :
  Recipient of the Perlis Family Order of the Gallant Prince Syed Putra Jamalullail (DK) (13 February 1978)
  :
  First Class of the Royal Family Order of Selangor (DK I) (21 July 1966)
  :
  Member first class of the Family Order of Terengganu (DK I) (23 June 1964)
  :
  Knight Grand Commander of the Order of the Star of Hornbill Sarawak (DP) – Datuk Patinggi

Foreign 
  :
 First Class of the Family Order of Laila Utama (DK) – Dato Laila Utama (1961)
  :
 Honorary Companion of the Order of St Michael and St George (CMG) (1952)
 Recipient of the Queen Elizabeth II Coronation Medal (1953)
 Knight Grand Cross of the Order of St Michael and St George (GCMG) (1972)

Places named after him
Several places were named after him, including:
 Petra Jaya, a suburb in Kuching, Sarawak
 Jalan Sultan Yahya Petra, Kuala Lumpur (formerly Jalan Semarak/Jalan Henry Gurney)
 Jalan Tuanku Yahya Petra, the main road on Penang Hill
 Jalan Sultan Yahya Petra in Kota Bharu, Kelantan
 Sultan Yahya Petra Mosque in Machang, Kelantan
 SK Sultan Yahya Petra (1), a primary school in Kuala Krai, Kelantan
 SK Sultan Yahya Petra (2), a primary school in Kuala Krai, Kelantan
 SMK Sultan Yahya Petra 1, a secondary school in Kuala Krai, Kelantan
 SMK Sultan Yahya Petra 2, a secondary school in Kuala Krai, Kelantan
 Sultan Yahya Petra Bridge in Kota Bharu, Kelantan
 Sultan Yahya Petra Second Bridge in Kota Bharu, Kelantan

Notes

Monarchs of Malaysia
Yahya Petra
1917 births
1979 deaths
Marshals of the Royal Malaysian Air Force
Yahya Petra
People from Kota Bharu
Malaysian people of Malay descent
Malaysian Muslims

First Classes of Royal Family Order of Selangor 

Recipients of the Darjah Kerabat Diraja Malaysia
Grand Commanders of the Order of the Defender of the Realm
Members of the Royal Family Order of Kedah
First Classes of the Family Order of Terengganu
Knights Grand Commander of the Order of the Star of Hornbill Sarawak

Honorary Companions of the Order of St Michael and St George
Knights Grand Cross of the Order of St Michael and St George
Yahya Petra
20th-century Malaysian politicians
Recipients of the Order of the Crown of the Realm